Filip Verlinden (born 26 December 1982) is a Belgian kickboxer who competes in the cruiserweight and heavyweight divisions. Verlinden was introduced to the sport at an early age and came to prominence in 2008 when he won the WKA European Super Cruiserweight Muay Thai Championship, followed by the WKA World Cruiserweight title the following year. He then took the gold medal at the 2010 IFMA World Championships in the +91 kg/200 lb division as an amateur before a short stint in the It's Showtime promotion where he unsuccessfully challenged Danyo Ilunga for the It's Showtime 95MAX Championship in June 2012. Later that year, he joined Glory.

Early life
Filip Verlinden was born in Lier, Belgium, and raised in Heist-op-den-Berg, Belgium. His father, Wim, was a Belgian champion kickboxer who trained under Cor Hemmers and so Filip was introduced to the sport at an early age, beginning kickboxing and Muay Thai at the age of ten. He himself would go on to train under Hemmers at Golden Glory Breda in the Netherlands while also being coached by his father at Bulls Gym in his homeland.

Career
After a rather unremarkable beginning to his career, in which he won fights against notables such as Rustemi Kreshnik, Dave Vader and lost a decision against Simon Marcus, Verlinden transcended the local Belgian circuit when he outpointed Marian Baryla to win the WKA European Super Cruiserweight (-90 kg/198.4 lb) Muay Thai Championship. He then made his debut with the It's Showtime promotion on 18 March 2009, losing on points to Rico Verhoeven in a heavyweight bout at Fights at the Border presents: It's Showtime 2009 in Antwerp, Belgium. He rebounded by winning the WKA World Cruiserweight (-85.9 kg/189.4 lb) title in Switzerland later that year.

In late 2010, Verlinden was recruited by United Glory to compete in the 2010-2011 World Series, an eight-man heavyweight tournament. The tournament kicked off in Amsterdam, Netherlands at United Glory 12: 2010-2011 World Series Quarterfinals on 16 October 2010 and Verlinden was eliminated when he lost to Brice Guidon by unanimous decision in a back-and-forth fight. He then returned to amateur Muay Thai to compete at the 2010 IFMA World Championships in Bangkok, Thailand in December 2010, winning the gold medal in the +91 kg/200 lb division. He defeated all three of his opponents on points, Sergei Lascenko in the quarter-finals, Alexei Kudin in the semis and Christian Colombo in the final.

Despite losing in his first outing in the promotion, Verlinden was invited to United Glory's next event to face Frédéric Sinistra in a non-tournament fight at United Glory 13: 2010-2011 World Series Semifinals in Charleroi, Belgium, on 19 March 2011. Verlinded outworked and outstruck Sinistra to win a unanimous decision in a bout to determine Belgium's top heavyweight kickboxer. He then signed with the Muaythai Premier League in August 2011 to compete in the short-lived promotion's -95 kg/210 lb heavyweight class. In his debut appearance, he scored a one-sided victory against Martin Jahn at Muaythai Premier League: Stars and Stripes in Long Beach, California, United States on 2 September 2011. After hurting his German opponent with a right overhand in round one a coming close to finishing him, the ringside physician stopped the bout at the end of the opening stanza due to a cut above Jahn's eye, giving Verlinden the TKO win. He beat Chris Knowles by way of unanimous decision at Muaythai Premier League: Blood and Steel in The Hague, Netherlands on 6 November 2011.

Verlinden made his return to It's Showtime three years after his first fight there to challenge Danyo Ilunga for his It's Showtime 95MAX (-95 kg/209 lb) Championship at Music Hall & BFN Group present: It's Showtime 57 & 58 in Brussels, Belgium, on 30 June 2012. He wobbled Ilunga with a knee strike in round one but it was not enough to secure victory as he lost by split decision after a scrappy, action-filled five round fight. After It's Showtime was bought out by the newly formed Glory organization, Verlinden soon transferred across and made his promotional debut in Brussels on 6 October 2012 at Glory 2: Brussels where he took a unanimous decision win over Fabiano Cyclone having scored a knockdown with a left hook in the second round.

He was among the best heavyweights in the world when he competed in the sixteen man 2012 Glory Heavyweight Grand Slam at Glory 4: Tokyo - 2012 Heavyweight Grand Slam in Saitama, Japan on 31 December 2012. Although he lost to Remy Bonjasky by unanimous decision at the opening round, his stock still rose in the world of international kickboxing. The lightest fighter in the tournament at 93.1 kg/205 lb, he was able to take the second round from Bonjasky and essentially force the fight into the third due to the "best of three" format in the tournament.

He made the drop down to Glory's -95 kg/209 lb light heavyweight division for his next fight at Glory 6: Istanbul in Istanbul, Turkey on 6 April 2013, when he was initially set to face Unai Unzai but his opponent was changed to Lucian Danilencu. He defeated Danilencu by unanimous decision in a rather lackluster affair.

Verlinden entered his third tournament and first at his natural weight class when he competed at Glory 9: New York - 2013 95kg Slam in New York City, New York, US on 22 June 2013. He took a controversial split decision over Steve McKinnon in the quarter-finals but lost out in a technical battle to eventual champion Tyrone Spong in the semis, losing by unanimous decision.

Verlinden lost to promotional newcomer Saulo Cavalari by unanimous decision at Glory 11: Chicago - Heavyweight World Championship Tournament in Hoffman Estates, Illinois, US on 12 October 2013.

He dropped down to Glory's middleweight (-85 kg/187 lb) division and defeated Israel Adesanya via unanimous decision at Glory 15: Istanbul in Istanbul, Turkey on 12 April 2014.

Verlinden competed in the Glory 17: Los Angeles - Last Man Standing middleweight tournament in Inglewood, California, US on 21 June 2014. He scored a first round knockdown over Melvin Manhoef with a head kick en route to a majority decision win in the quarter-finals before losing to the eventual champion Artem Levin in the semi-finals by unanimous decision.

Championships and awards

Kickboxing
Belgian Kickboxing
Belgian +95 kg/209 lb Championship
International Federation of Muaythai Amateur
2010 IFMA World Championships +91 kg/200 lb Gold Medalist 
World Kickboxing Association
WKA European Super Cruiserweight (-90 kg/198.4 lb) Muay Thai Championship
WKA World Thaiboxing Cruiserweight (-85.9 kg/189.4 lb) Championship

Fight record

|-  bgcolor="#FFBBBB"
|2018-12-07 || Loss ||align=left| Ulric Bokeme || Enfusion Live || United Arab Emirates || Decision   || 3 || 3:00
|-  bgcolor="#CCFFCC"
|2018-09-15 || Win ||align=left| Mohamed El Moussaoui || Enfusion Live 70|| Belgium || TKO (Referee Stoppage)|| 2 ||
|-  bgcolor="#FFBBBB"
|2018-05-05 || Loss ||align=left| Boubaker El Bakouri || Enfusion Live || Spain || Decision   || 3 || 3:00
|-  bgcolor="#FFBBBB"
|2017-12-9 || Loss ||align=left| Joe Schilling || Bellator Kickboxing 8: Florence || Florence, Italy || Decision (unanimous)  || 3 || 3:00 
|-
|-  bgcolor="#CCFFCC"
| 2017-11-18|| Win ||align=left| Mauricio Costa Cardoso || Enfusion Live 56, League R. 2 || Groningen, Netherlands || Decision || 3 || 3:00 
|-
|-  bgcolor="#FFBBBB"
| 2017-09-16|| Loss ||align=left| Lorenzo Javier Jorge || Enfusion Live 52, League R. 1 || Zwolle, Netherlands || Decision || 3 || 3:00
|- 
|-  bgcolor="#FFBBBB"
| 2017-08-04 || Loss ||align=left| Mikhail Chalykh  || Fight Night Saint-Tropez || France || Decision  || 3 || 3:00
|-
|-  bgcolor="#FFBBBB"
| 2017-04-29 || Loss ||align=left| Ibrahim El Boustati || Enfusion Live 49 || The Hague, Netherlands || Decision (unanimous) || 3 || 3:00
|-
! style=background:white colspan=9 |
|-
|-  bgcolor="#CCFFCC"
| 2016-09-17 || Win ||align=left| Ibrahim El Boustati || Enfusion Live 41 || Anvers, Belgium || Decision (overturned) || 3 || 3:00 
|-  bgcolor="#FFBBBB"
| 2016-07-02 || Loss ||align=left| Israel Adesanya || Glory of Heroes 3 || Jiyuan, Henan, China || Decision (unanimous) || 3 || 3:00 
|-  bgcolor="#FFBBBB"
| 2016-03-12 || Loss ||align=left| Jason Wilnis || Glory 28: Paris || Paris, France || Decision (unanimous) || 3 || 3:00 
|-  bgcolor="#FFBBBB"
| 2015-08-04 || Loss ||align=left| Aleksander Vezhevatov || Fight Night Saint-Tropez  || Saint Tropez, France ||Decision (unanimous) || 4  || 2:00 
|-  bgcolor="#FFBBBB"
| 2015-06-05 || Loss ||align=left| Mourad Bouzidi || Glory 22: Lille || Lille, France, || Decision (unanimous) || 3 || 3:00
|-  bgcolor="#CCFFCC"
| 2014-08-04 || Win ||align=left| Corentin Jallon || Fight Night Saint-Tropez II || Saint-Tropez, France || Decision || 3 || 3:00 
|-  bgcolor="#FFBBBB"
| 2014-06-21 || Loss ||align=left|  Artem Levin || Glory 17: Los Angeles - Middleweight Last Man Standing Tournament, Semi Finals || Inglewood, California, USA || Decision (unanimous) || 3 || 3:00
|-  bgcolor="#CCFFCC"
| 2014-06-21 || Win ||align=left|  Melvin Manhoef || Glory 17: Los Angeles - Middleweight Last Man Standing Tournament, Quarter Finals || Inglewood, California, USA || Decision (majority) || 3 || 3:00
|-  bgcolor="#CCFFCC"
| 2014-04-12 || Win ||align=left| Israel Adesanya || Glory 15: Istanbul || Istanbul, Turkey || Decision (unanimous) || 3 || 3:00
|-  bgcolor="#FFBBBB"
| 2013-10-12 || Loss ||align=left| Saulo Cavalari || Glory 11: Chicago - Heavyweight World Championship Tournament || Hoffman Estates, Illinois, USA || Decision (unanimous) || 3 || 3:00
|-
|-  bgcolor="#FFBBBB"
| 2013-06-22 || Loss ||align=left| Tyrone Spong || Glory 9: New York - 2013 95kg Slam, Semi Finals || New York City, New York, USA || Decision (unanimous) || 3 || 3:00
|-
|-  bgcolor="#CCFFCC"
| 2013-06-22 || Win ||align=left| Steve McKinnon || Glory 9: New York - 2013 95kg Slam, Quarter Finals || New York City, New York, USA || Decision (split) || 3 || 3:00
|-
|-  bgcolor="#CCFFCC"
| 2013-04-06 || Win ||align=left| Lucian Danilencu || Glory 6: Istanbul || Istanbul, Turkey || Decision (unanimous) || 3 || 3:00
|-
|-  bgcolor="#FFBBBB"
| 2012-12-31 || Loss ||align=left| Remy Bonjasky || Glory 4: Tokyo - 2012 Heavyweight Grand Slam, First Round || Saitama, Japan || Decision (unanimous) || 3 || 2:00
|-
|-  bgcolor="#CCFFCC"
| 2012-10-06 || Win ||align=left| Fabiano Cyclone || Glory 2: Brussels || Brussels, Belgium || Decision (unanimous) || 3 || 3:00
|-
|-  bgcolor="#FFBBBB"
| 2012-06-30 || Loss ||align=left| Danyo Ilunga || Music Hall & BFN Group present: It's Showtime 57 & 58 || Brussels, Belgium || Decision (split) || 5 || 3:00
|-
! style=background:white colspan=9 |
|-
|-  bgcolor="#CCFFCC"
| 2012-01-00 || Win ||align=left| Hicham Diop || || || TKO (leg injury) || 4 || 0:31 
|-
|-  bgcolor="#CCFFCC"
| 2011-11-06 || Win ||align=left| Chris Knowles || Muaythai Premier League: Blood and Steel || The Hague, Netherlands || Decision (unanimous) || 3 || 3:00
|-
|-  bgcolor="#CCFFCC"
| 2011-09-02 || Win ||align=left| Martin Jahn || Muaythai Premier League: Stars and Stripes || Long Beach, California, USA || TKO (doctor stoppage) || 1 || 3:00
|-
|-  bgcolor="#CCFFCC"
| 2011-05-22 || Win ||align=left| Mamoudou Keta || Thaiboxinggala Putte || Putte, Belgium || TKO (cut) || 1 || 1:51
|-
|-  bgcolor="#CCFFCC"
| 2011-03-19 || Win ||align=left| Frédéric Sinistra || United Glory 13: 2010-2011 World Series Semifinals || Charleroi, Belgium || Decision (unanimous) || 3 || 3:00
|-
|-  bgcolor="#FFBBBB"
| 2010-10-16 || Loss ||align=left| Brice Guidon || United Glory 12: 2010-2011 World Series Quarterfinals, Quarter Finals || Amsterdam, Netherlands || Decision (unanimous) || 3 || 3:00
|-
|-  bgcolor="#CCFFCC"
| 2010-08-29 || Win ||align=left| Redouan Cairo || Fighting with the Stars || Paramaribo, Suriname || Decision || 3 || 3:00
|-
|-  bgcolor="#CCFFCC"
| 2009-00-00 || Win ||align=left| || || Switzerland || || ||
|-
! style=background:white colspan=9 |
|-
|-  bgcolor="#FFBBBB"
| 2009-03-18 || Loss ||align=left| Rico Verhoeven || Fights at the Border presents: It's Showtime 2009 || Antwerp, Belgium || Decision || 3 || 3:00
|-
|-  bgcolor="#CCFFCC"
| 2008-00-00 || Win ||align=left| Marian Baryla || || Belgium || Decision || 5 || 3:00
|-
! style=background:white colspan=9 |
|-
|-  bgcolor="#CCFFCC"
| 2007-03-24 || Win ||align=left| Karim el Baze || Fights At The Border || Lommel, Belgium || Decision || 5 || 3:00
|-
|-  bgcolor="#FFBBBB"
| 0000-00-00 || Loss ||align=left| Simon Marcus || || || || ||
|-
|-  bgcolor="#CCFFCC"
| 2005-10-00 || Win ||align=left| Rustemi Kreshnik || Fight of the Gladiator 4 || Belgium || Decision || 5 || 2:00

|-
|-  bgcolor="#CCFFCC"
| 2010-12- || Win ||align=left| Christian Colombo || 2010 IFMA World Championships, Final || Bangkok, Thailand || Decision || 4 || 2:00
|-
! style=background:white colspan=9 |
|-
|-  bgcolor="#CCFFCC"
| 2010-12- || Win ||align=left| Alexei Kudin || 2010 IFMA World Championships, Semi Finals || Bangkok, Thailand || Decision || 4 || 2:00
|-
|-  bgcolor="#CCFFCC"
| 2010-12- || Win ||align=left| Sergei Lascenko || 2010 IFMA World Championships, Quarter Finals || Bangkok, Thailand || Decision || 4 || 2:00
|-
|-
| colspan=9 | Legend:

References

External links
 Official site
 Official Glory profile

Living people
1982 births
Belgian male kickboxers
Cruiserweight kickboxers
Heavyweight kickboxers
Belgian Muay Thai practitioners
People from Lier, Belgium
Sportspeople from Breda
Belgian expatriates in the Netherlands
Glory kickboxers